Richard Kogan may refer to:

Richard Kogan (businessman) (born 1941), former president and chief executive officer of Schering-Plough
Richard Kogan (physician) (born 1955), professor of psychiatry and concert pianist
Richard Kogan (commentator), researcher and policy analyst, see Budget and Accounting Transparency Act of 2014
Rick Kogan, Chicago newspaperman, radio personality and author